The Pakistan men's national 3x3 team represents Pakistan in international 3x3 basketball matches and is controlled by the Pakistan Basketball Federation.

See also
Pakistan men's national basketball team
Pakistan women's national 3x3 team

References

Men's national 3x3 basketball teams
Basketball in Pakistan
B